Campiglossa murina is a species of fruit fly in the family Tephritidae.

Distribution
The species is found in Alaska, Yukon, the Northwest Territories, South to California, New Mexico.

References

Tephritinae
Insects described in 1899
Diptera of North America